Oleksandr Georgyovich Pavlenko was a Soviet footballer and coach from Ukraine.

External links
 Oleksandr Pavlenko on football.odessa.ua
 All specialists of Bukovyna on FC Bukovyna Chernivtsi website

1941 births
1995 deaths
Sportspeople from Ternopil
Soviet footballers
FC Polissya Zhytomyr players
FC Chornomorets Odesa players
FC Nyva Vinnytsia players
FC Bukovyna Chernivtsi players
Soviet football managers
Ukrainian football managers
FC Nyva Ternopil managers
FC Bukovyna Chernivtsi managers
Ukrainian Premier League managers
Association footballers not categorized by position